Crescent Sail Yacht Club (CSYC) is a private sailing club and marina on Lake Saint Clair in Michigan.  Crescent is a member of the Detroit Regional Yacht-racing Association (DRYA).

History 
On the evening of September 23, 1932 a group of young men met at the residence of Chalmers Burn and agreed to the formation of a club for the purpose of fostering yacht sailing. The September 30th meeting fixed a Membership Fee at $10.00 and a first year dues at $6.00. The name of "Corinthian Sailors Club" was suggested as a club name. At the dinner meeting on October 28, the name "Corinthian Sail Yacht Club" was adopted. Temporary Officers were elected: Chalmers Burn as Commodore, Art Miller as Vice Commodore and Charles Parker as Secretary-Treasurer. On December 2, the first annual election was held after dinner at Joe Muer’s Oyster Bar.  Chalmers Burn was elected Commodore, Art Miller - Vice Commodore and Howard Lauhoff - Rear Commodore.  The Constitution was presented, discussed and unanimously adopted. Finally, the club was formed in 1933 with the name Crescent Sail Yacht Club when a group in nearby Marblehead was revived under the name "Corinthian Sail Yacht Club."

It was founded as a sailing club for "men (and now women) of moderate means" and this principle was embodied in the requirement, still in place today, that all members perform a minimum number of annual work hours as part of their membership.

The club hosted the 1942 Snipe World Championship.

Sailing Education 
Junior and Adult sailing lessons and racing instruction is offered through the Crescent Sailing Association, the non-profit educational organization located at CSYC.

One-Design Racing 
One-design racing is extremely active at CSYC, with the following dinghy and keelboat fleets represented at the club:

Dinghies
Flying Junior
Flying Scot
Formula 18
420 (dinghy)
Laser (dinghy)
Lightning (dinghy)
Optimist (dinghy)
Thistle (dinghy)
Tornado (sailboat)

Keelboats
Beneteau 36.7
Cal Yachts 20
Cal Yachts 25
Etchells
Fareast 28
Express 27
J/24
J/35
J/105
J/120
Melges 24
S2 Yachts 7.9
Tartan Ten

External links
Official website

References

1933 establishments in Michigan
Yacht clubs in the United States
Sailing in Michigan
Sports venues in Metro Detroit